The West Side Historic District is a set of ninety-eight buildings on the west side of the Fox River in Aurora, Illinois. Of these, seventy-seven contribute to the historical value of the district.

History
Aurora was platted by Samuel and Joseph McCarty in 1835. Aurora was a popular destination for settlers from the eastern United States due to its proximity to Chicago yet scenic atmosphere. The Chicago, Burlington and Quincy Railroad relocated its headquarters to Aurora in 1855. Expecting a rise in population due to the railroad's employment opportunities, Aurora platted a new residential section of land west of the Fox River. Aurora indeed expanded rapidly during that period, almost doubling in population from 1860 to 1874. Most of the new lands were along the river, with a section following several streets westward. Industrial growth followed in the 1880s, spurring a need for developed city services. Aurora became the first city to have electric street lighting in 1881.

The west side was originally noted for its wide range of Italianate residences. Two large apartment buildings were built along Downer Place between 1882 and 1890. As construction in the district continued in the 1890s, Queen Anne became the dominate architectural style. Smaller houses were built in the Foursquare style, some with Prairie School influences.

The west side district was the homestead for wealthy Aurora citizens throughout its history. Local pharmacist David Hurd owned a Second Empire home, constructed in 1856 and now recognized as an Aurora Landmark. Aurora mayor Fred O. White designed a Queen Anne residence that was completed after his death by his wife. White's sisters-in-law, Mary and Emma Todd, moved in shortly afterward. William Jobbins was the president of Alba Manufacturing Co. and lived in a 1909 Colonial Revival residence. The Col. Ira C. Copley Mansion was constructed for Ira Clifton Copley, founder of the Copley Press and later member of the U.S. House of Representatives from 1911 to 1923. His house was designed by Jarvis Hunt and constructed in 1917.

See also
Healy Chapel, located within the district but listed as a non-contributing structure.

References

External links

 Westside National Register Historic District

History of Aurora, Illinois
Historic districts on the National Register of Historic Places in Illinois
National Register of Historic Places in Kane County, Illinois
Geography of Kane County, Illinois
Buildings and structures in Aurora, Illinois
Geography of Aurora, Illinois
Houses on the National Register of Historic Places in Illinois
Houses in Kane County, Illinois